Chhuti ( English: A Vacation) is a 1967 Bengali film, based on a novel by Bimal Kar. It marked the directorial debut of Arundhati Devi, who also wrote the screenplay and composed the music for the film. At the 14th National Film Awards, it won the National Film Award for Best Film Based on High Literary Work. It also won a number of BFJA Awards, including Best Director.

Synopsis 
The film is set in a small town in Bihar (now Jharkhand). All the main characters belong to a Bengali Christian community settled there. Bhramar (Nandini Maliya) is a teenage girl who lives with her father (Ajitesh Bandopadhyay) and her stepmother (Debabrati Sen). She is quiet and solitary, and remains sad since her relationship with her stepmother is not good. She has a good singing voice, but cannot tell anyone about her aspiration to become a singer. A young man, Amal (Mrinal Mukherjee) comes to spend his vacation with them. The two fall in love. Amal encourages Bhramar to sing, and they spend some good moments together. Bhramar, however, has been ill for some time, and has hidden the fact from everybody. Finally, her illness becomes too severe to be concealed. She is diagnosed with Leukemia, and has to be hospitalised. Amal, aware that her illness is probably terminal, promises to wait for her.

Cast 
 Nandini Maliya as Bhramar
 Mrinal Mukherjee as Amal
 Ajitesh Bandopadhyay as Bhramar's father
 Debabrati Sen as Himani (Bhramar's stepmother)
 Nirmal Chatterjee as Dr Majumdar

Crew 
 Direction - Arundhati Devi
 Cinematography - Bimal Mukherjee
 Editing - Subodh Roy
 Music - Arundhati Devi

Production 
The film was shot on location in and around the hill town of McCluskieganj, in present-day Jharkhand.

Reception 
When released, the film's simple story of young love appealed to audiences. The use of Rabindrasangeet added to its attraction.  The three Tagore songs sung by Pratima Banerjee and Chinmoy Chatterjee remain popular to this day. Banerjee received the BFJA Award for Best Playback Singer (Female).

The film was also critically acclaimed, winning a National Award and several BFJA Awards. The Encyclopedia of Indian Cinema describes Chhuti as a "lyrical melodrama", and observes that "... it distances itself from the tradition of popular romances addressing similar themes of terminal illness - by a literal process of exclusion."

According to Upperstall, Arundhati Devi's move to filmmaking with Chhuti was "a major step in breaking the patriarchal Tollygunje Studio set-up". It adds that the film "exploited the sylvan surroundings ... to the hilt with some wonderful lyrical imagery."

Preservation 
The film has been restored and digitised by the National Film Archive of India.

Home media 
Chhuti is available in VCD format.

Awards 
 14th National Film Awards -- National Film Award for Best Film Based on High Literary Work
 BFJA Awards 1968
 Best Indian Films (along with 8 others)
 Best Director -- Arundhati Devi
 Best Screenplay—Arundhati Devi
 Best Dialogue -- Bimal Kar
 Best Editing—Subodh Roy
 Best Playback Singer (Female) -- Pratima Banerjee
 Special Award—Nandini Maliya

References

External links 
 

1967 films
Bengali-language Indian films
Indian black-and-white films
Films based on Indian novels
Films set in Jharkhand
1960s Bengali-language films